Mount Hawkins is a summit in Alberta, Canada.

Mount Hawkins was named after J. S. Hawkins, a government surveyor.

References

Hawkins
Alberta's Rockies